Aleksandr Lebedev (born 29 May 1987) is a Russian speed skater. He competed in three events at the 2010 Winter Olympics.

References

External links
 

1987 births
Living people
Russian male speed skaters
Olympic speed skaters of Russia
Speed skaters at the 2010 Winter Olympics
Speed skaters from Moscow